Bareilly Cantonment is a cantonment town located in the Bareilly district of the north Indian state of Uttar Pradesh.

History 
The city of Bareilly, along with the entire Rohilkhand region, came under the suzerainty of the British East India Company in 1801. The Bareilly Cantonment was established by the company in 1811, when a small fort was constructed to the south of the city, and a few years later, the cantonment area contained much more buildings than in the entire city.

The city of Bareilly played a major role in the Indian Rebellion of 1857, and as a result, the cantonment saw major damages. When Bareilly was recaptured by the British in 1858, regular British troops were deployed in the cantonment area. The cantonment at that time used to be mainly divided into three parts; The Indian Infantry lines were in the eastern part, British Infantry lines and an Indian battalion were in the middle part, while the Artillery lines were stationed in the western part of the cantonment.

Geography 

It is surrounded on all sides by Bareilly city and is located to the south of the city centre. The neighbourhood of Civil Lines lies to its north, Kandherpur, Chanehti and Thiriya Nizamat Khan to its south and Nakatiya and Bhartaul lie to its east while a Railway Line separates it from the neighborhood of Subhash Nagar on the west. Several green areas are located in the Cantonment including the Phool Bagh Garden and The Army Ecological Park & Training Area (AEPTA), which also houses a Golf course.

Demographics 

 India census, Bareilly Cantonment had a population of 30,003. Males constitute 59.1% of the population and females 40.9%. Bareilly Cantonment has an average literacy rate of 87.91%, higher than the national average of 59.5%; with 92.54% of the males and 81.09% of females literate. 10.45% of the population is under 6 years of age.

Major Units / Formations 
 Jat Regimental Centre (JRC)
 Headquarters Uttar Bharat Area
 Headquarters 6 Mountain Division
 Junior Leaders Academy (JLA)

Transport 

The Bareilly Junction railway station (station code: BE) is located near the western limits of the Cantonment, while the Chanehti Railway Station (station code: CHTI) is located to its south. The Cantonment sometimes lends its name to the Chanehti station, which is also called the Bareilly Cantt Station. The Bareilly Satellite bus station is located near the eastern limits of the Cantonment.

References

External links
 Bareilly Cantonment Board website
 Bareilly District website

Cities and towns in Bareilly district
Cantonments of India
Cantonment towns in Uttar Pradesh